The National Lighthouse Museum is a museum in St. George, Staten Island, New York City, United States, that is dedicated to the history of lighthouses and their keepers. It officially opened in 2015. The museum is located within the former Foundry Building of the United States Lighthouse Service General Depot, later the Staten Island Coast Guard Station.

Context 
The National Lighthouse Museum concept was born out of the need to educate and preserve the navigational history of lighthouses, which is being lost due to modern technology such as GPS, Solar panels, etc. As these structures become obsolete, their desirable locations drew developers eager to build on the magnificent sites. In the 1940s, the Shinnecock Light, on the south shore of Long Island, became unstable and U.S. Coast Guard safety concerns initiated the process of having it removed. Despite the desire of local residents to preserve the lighthouse, the iconic structure was demolished and eventually replaced by a golf course. A similar fate seemed inevitable for the famous Fire Island Light in the 1990s, when it too was targeted for destruction and development. The local community came to the rescue and the Fire Island Light Preservation Society saved the structure.

The threat of destruction of many of these fabled landmarks created a groundswell of public support for the preservation of lighthouses. The rescue of the Fire Island Light, and similar efforts around the country, inspired the creation of an American Lighthouse Coordinating Committee, whose purpose was to find a site for a prestigious national museum that would be entrusted to preserve such history for generations to come.

Site selection and opening 
In 1998, the ALCC issued a nationwide Request for Proposals (RFP) for a National Lighthouse Center and Museum. Seventeen proposals were submitted from groups around the United States. After a series of presentations and deliberations, the former site of the St. George Coast Guard Station, a National Register of Historic Places listing and a city landmark, was selected as the winner. It was also the former location of the New York Marine Hospital and the Staten Island Quarantine War.

The site was selected because of its historic significance and because of its central location in one of the busiest harbors in the country. The site's location adjacent to the Staten Island Ferry's St. George Terminal was also a primary consideration in the selection, as the ferry sees millions of tourists every year. The opportunity to have a national level museum on Staten Island and the cultural and economic opportunities of luring tourists off the Staten Island Ferry inspired the support of New York Governor George Pataki, New York City Mayor Rudolph Giuliani, and Staten Island Borough President Guy Molinari, who provided over $7 million to begin the renovation of the site.

The National Lighthouse Center and Museum was issued its Museum Charter by the New York State Board of Regents on November 9, 2001. However, it had trouble raising funds: by 2000, it had raised only 2% of the $5 million necessary to start operations, despite being in the second year of a five-year fundraising drive. As a result, the museum opening was subsequently postponed from 2001 to 2003. The museum board was dissolved in 2009, with officials citing slow fundraising activity following the September 11 attacks in 2001, as well as the budget rising to $15 million. By that time, the New York City Economic Development Corporation (EDC) had spent $8 million on stabilizing the structures at the Coast Guard Station. In 2013, John Catsimatidis donated $105,000 toward the museum. The same year, the museum board was reconvened, and the EDC asked the board to procure $350,000 in exchange for the EDC renting out the foundry for the museum's use for $1 per year. The museum was finally opened in 2015 within the former foundry.

Mission 
The mission of the museum is:

 To establish and maintain a history museum open to the public relating to lighthouses and located on Staten Island, County of Richmond, New York.
 To collect, preserve, and interpret objects related to the history and technology of lighthouses located, in the past or present, at sites throughout the United States.
 To research, document and disseminate information on the history and technology of American lighthouses.
 To create and maintain an archive of artefacts and materials related to American lighthouses.
 To foster research of American lighthouse history.
 To serve as a contact point for public inquiry and assistance with respect to American lighthouse history, research, education, collections and programs
 To celebrate American lighthouse heritage through education programs, publications, films, festivals, living history, lighthouse trails, conferences, and other such offerings.
 To support other existing and future lighthouse museums, organizations and sites.
 To establish partnerships with other organizations to attain the above goals.

References

External links 
 Museum website
 

2015 establishments in New York City
Museums established in 2015
Museums in Staten Island
History museums in New York City
Lighthouse museums in New York (state)
St. George, Staten Island